Burgseeli (or Burgseewli) is a lake in the Canton of Berne, Switzerland. Its surface area is 5.25 ha. It is located between Ringgenberg and Goldswil on the northern shore of Lake Brienz. Swimming is possible at a bathing beach. Given its relatively small size temperatures up to 26 °C are reached.

References

Bernese Oberland
Lakes of Switzerland
Lakes of the canton of Bern